The Virgins were an American indie rock band formed in 2006 in New York City. The band split up in November 2013.

History

2006–2007: Formation
Frontman Donald Cumming began writing music by himself in his New York apartment. He then recruited friends to fill out the band.
 
Almost immediately they made a five-song EP titled The Virgins '07, compiled of the band's early recordings, and songs Donald had already recorded himself. Upon completion, Cumming passed out the EP to friends and DJs causing the music to pervade the New York club scene. Soon after, the demo came across Atlantic Records who signed Cumming before the band was fully formed. The band's debut LP came out in 2008 and the band toured for several years following its release.

2008–2011: The Virgins
Their first album titled The Virgins was met with mixed success critically. To promote the record they played at the All Points West Festival, SXSW festival, Lollapalooza, Glastonbury, Leeds, Reading, and T in the Park festivals, among other major French, German, Norwegian, Swedish, Dutch, Spanish, and Italian festivals in the summer of 2009.  In the fall of 2009 they were invited to perform in Moscow.

The song "Rich Girls" was number 68 on Rolling Stones list of the 100 Best Songs of 2008 (although no sequential order was intended).

2012–2013: Strike Gently and break-up
In 2012, the band announced their return with an all new line-up backing leader Donald Cumming. The band also announced that it signed with the new record label Cult Records, founded by Julian Casablancas of The Strokes. In March 2013 The band released their new album "Strike Gently" worldwide.

The band supported the album with several US tours as well as touring South America and Europe.

Additionally, in support of the new album, the band made their second appearance on NBC’s Late Night with Jimmy Fallon, performing the track "Wheel of Fortune".

In April 2013, it was announced that The Virgins would be joining The Killers on tour in May for a series of special shows, including a date at NYC's Madison Square Garden on May 14.

On November 13, 2013, Cumming announced that the band had split. In an interview that day with Rolling Stone, Cumming said that he will now start working on a solo record. The band's planned Europe tour for 2014 was cancelled as well.

After the break up, John Eatherly and Xan Aird founded the NYC band Public Access T.V. 

Bass guitarist Nick Zarin-Ackerman died on March 30, 2017.

Discography
Studio albums
The Virgins (June 3, 2008, Atlantic Records)
Strike Gently (March 12, 2013, Cult Records)

Extended plays
The Virgins '07 (2007)

Singles
Venus in Chains w/ Slave to You (May 26, 2012, Glassine Box)

Members
Donald Cumming - lead vocals
Wade Oates - lead guitar, backing vocals
 Nick Zarin-Ackerman - bass guitar, backing vocals
 Erik Ratensperger - drums
Xan Aird - lead Guitar
 Max Kamins - bass guitar 
John Eatherly - drums

Appearance
In the 2010 action comedy film Cop Out, the daughter of James "Jimmy" Monroe (Bruce Willis) was planning a wedding and wanted The Virgins to play at the wedding, saying they were a little bit edgy.

References

2006 establishments in New York City
Atlantic Records artists
Dance-punk musical groups
Indie rock musical groups from New York (state)
Musical groups disestablished in 2013
Musical groups established in 2006
Musical groups from New York City
Musical quartets
Post-punk revival music groups
Cult Records artists